Kacey Rohl (born August 6, 1991) is a Canadian actress. She is known for playing Sterling Fitch in the television crime drama The Killing, Prudence in the 2011 dark fantasy film Red Riding Hood, and Abigail Hobbs in the television drama Hannibal. Rohl has starred as Jenna Engel in the 2014 television sitcom Working the Engels, and as Kerry Campbell in the second season of the television sci-fi drama series Wayward Pines. In 2018, she played the lead role of Katie Arneson in the 2018 Canadian psychological thriller film White Lie.

Personal life 
Rohl was born in and currently resides in Vancouver, British Columbia. Her father is television director Michael Rohl, and her mother, Jan Derbyshire, is a playwright and comedian who also works in the entertainment industry. She began studying acting when she was 14.

Career 
Rohl's first prominent acting role was playing Sterling Fitch in the first two seasons of the AMC crime drama The Killing in 2011–2012. Also in 2011, she played Prudence in the 2011 dark fantasy film Red Riding Hood. From 2013 to 2015, Rohl recurred as Abigail Hobbs in the NBC television crime drama Hannibal. She was cast in the starring role of daughter Jenna Engel in the 2014 NBC sitcom Working the Engels.

Since 2015, Rohl has recurred as Marina on the Syfy television series The Magicians. In 2016, she appeared in the thirteenth episode of the fifth season of the ABC television series Once Upon a Time, playing the role of Megara. Rohl was cast in the regular role of Kerry Campbell in the second season of the Fox sci-fi drama television series Wayward Pines which aired mid-2016. Since 2017 she has played the recurring role of Alena on The CW superhero drama series Arrow.

Rohl starred in the 2018 Canadian psychological thriller film White Lie, playing the lead role of Katie Arneson. She received a Canadian Screen Award nomination for Best Actress at the 8th Canadian Screen Awards for her performance.

She starred as Sabrina Swanson in the 2018 Syfy horror television film Killer High. In July 2019, Rohl was cast in the 2020 Canadian spy thriller series Fortunate Son.

Filmography

References

External links 

 

1991 births
Living people
21st-century Canadian actresses
Actresses from Vancouver
Canadian film actresses
Canadian television actresses